Samanta Fabris (born ) is a Croatian volleyball player. She plays as opposite hitter for Turkish club Eczacıbaşı Dynavit.

Clubs
  ŽOK Rijeka (2008–2012)
  Chieri Volley (2012–2013)
  LJ Modena (2013–2015)
  AGIL Volley Novara (2015–2016)
  Pomi Casalmaggiore (2016–2017)
  Imoco Volley Conegliano (2017–2019)
  WVC Dynamo Kazan (2019–2022)
  Eczacıbaşı Dynavit (2022–present)

International career 
She is a member of the Croatia women's national volleyball team. Fabris was part of the Croatian national team at the 2014 FIVB Volleyball Women's World Championship in Italy, and 2021 Women's European Volleyball League, winning a silver medal.

Awards

Club
Imoco Volley Conegliano
 Italian League: 2018

WVC Dynamo Kazan
 Russian Super League: 2020
 Russian Cup: 2019, 2020, 2021

References

1992 births
Living people
Sportspeople from Pula
Croatian women's volleyball players
Volleyball players at the 2015 European Games
European Games competitors for Croatia
Opposite hitters
Croatian expatriate sportspeople in Italy
Expatriate volleyball players in Italy
Expatriate volleyball players in Russia
Expatriate volleyball players in Turkey
Mediterranean Games gold medalists for Croatia
Mediterranean Games bronze medalists for Croatia
Mediterranean Games medalists in volleyball
Competitors at the 2013 Mediterranean Games
Competitors at the 2018 Mediterranean Games
21st-century Croatian women
Croatian expatriate volleyball players